Algorithmica is a monthly peer-reviewed scientific journal focusing on research and the application of computer science algorithms. The journal was established in 1986 and is published by Springer Science+Business Media. The editor in chief is Mohammad Hajiaghayi. Subject coverage includes sorting, searching, data structures, computational geometry, and linear programming, VLSI, distributed computing, parallel processing, computer aided design, robotics, graphics, data base design, and software tools.

Abstracting and indexing
This journal is indexed by the following services:

See also
ACM Transactions on Algorithms
Algorithms (journal)
Discrete Mathematics & Theoretical Computer Science

References

 Algorithmica received the highest possible ranking “A*”.

External links 
 Springer information

Computer science journals
Springer Science+Business Media academic journals
Monthly journals
Publications established in 1986
English-language journals